The Starkey Baronetcy, of Norwood Park in the Parish of Southwell and the County of Nottingham, is a title in the baronetage of the United Kingdom. It was created on 9 July 1935 for John Starkey, who had earlier represented Newark in the House of Commons as a conservative. The second baronet was a lieutenant-colonel in the army and served as High Sheriff of Nottinghamshire in 1954. The third baronet was a deputy lieutenant of Nottinghamshire in 1981 and High Sheriff of Nottinghamshire in 1987.

Starkey baronets, of Norwood Park (1935)
Sir John Ralph Starkey, 1st Baronet (1859–1940)
Sir William Randle Starkey, 2nd Baronet (1899–1977)
Sir John Philip Starkey, 3rd Baronet (born 1938)

Notes

References
Kidd, Charles, Williamson, David (editors). Debrett's Peerage and Baronetage (1990 edition). New York: St Martin's Press, 1990, 

Starkey